This is a list of famous people who were born, spent a majority of their life, or currently live in Tijuana, Baja California, Mexico.

A
 Alejandro Amaya, bullfighter
 Fernando Arce, professional football player (Originally from Mérida, Yucatán)

B
Beatriz Adriana, singer (Originally from Navojoa, Sonora)
Brandon Moreno, UFC Flyweight Champion

C
 Jorge Campillo, professional baseball player
 Laura Caro, singer-songwriter and actress

D
 Lupita D'Alessio, singer
 Jean Dawson, musician

E
 Juan Jose Estrada, professional boxer

G
 Ana Gabriel, singer
 Alejandro Garcia, professional boxer
 El Generico, professional wrestler (Originally from Laval, Quebec, Canada)
 Benji Gil, professional baseball player
 Adrián González, professional baseball player (Originally from San Diego, California, United States of America)
 Edgar Gonzalez, professional baseball player (Originally from San Diego, California, United States of America)

H
 Alejandro Hernandez, professional tennis player

J
 Frankie J, rapper
 Héctor Jiménez, actor

K
 Alejandro Kirk, professional baseball player

L
 Esteban Loaiza, professional baseball player

M
 Antonio Margarito, professional boxer (Originally from Torrance, California, United States of America)
 Paloma Márquez, actress
 Manuel Medina, professional boxer (Originally from Tecuala, Nayarit)
 Ricardo Menéndez March, New Zealand politician
 Rey Misterio, professional wrestler
 Erik Morales, professional boxer
Brandon Moreno, professional mixed martial artist, first Mexican-born UFC Champion.
 Agustin Murillo, professional baseball player
 Rey Mysterio, Jr., professional wrestler (Originally from Chula Vista, California, United States of America)
 Felicia Mercado, Movies and TV Actress, Miss Mexico 1977

P
 Raúl Pérez, professional boxer
 Tony Perry, guitarist of Pierce the Veil
 Javier Plascencia, Mexican chef

R
 Victor Regalado, professional golfer
 Marco Antonio Regil, television host
 Tlaloc Rivas, theatre director, writer, and professor
 Oscar Robles, professional baseball player
 Julio E. Rubio, researcher and administrator at Tecnológico de Monterrey

S
 Rafael Saavedra, writer, DJ
 Freddy Sandoval, professional baseball player
 Carlos Santana, musician (Originally from Autlán, Jalisco)
 Jose Silva, professional baseball player

T
 Jorge Torres Nilo, professional football player
 Thunder Rosa, professional wrestler

V
 Julieta Venegas, singer (Originally from Long Beach, California, United States of America)
 Raúl Pompa Victoria, Mexican politician (Institutional Revolutionary Party).

Z
 Gabino Zavala, retired Roman Catholic bishop of the Archdiocese of Los Angeles, father of two children

References

Tijuana